Zaitseve is a village in Svatove Raion (district) in Luhansk Oblast of eastern Ukraine, at about 60 km NNW from the centre of Luhansk.

Demographics
In 2001 the settlement had 235 inhabitants. Native language as of the Ukrainian Census of 2001:
Ukrainian — 88.09%
Russian — 11.91%

References

Villages in Svatove Raion